United States v. Dixon, 509 U.S. 688 (1993), was a decision of the United States Supreme Court concerning double jeopardy. The case overruled Grady v. Corbin (1990) and revived the traditional Blockburger standard. The case held that subsequent convictions for offenses that contained the same elements were violative of the Double Jeopardy Clause.

Background
Alvin Dixon was arrested for murder in the District of Columbia and released on bail, on the condition that he not commit any criminal offense, or he would be held in contempt of court. While awaiting trial, Dixon was arrested and indicted for possession of cocaine with intent to distribute and was found guilty of contempt and sentenced to 180 days in jail. Dixon moved to dismiss this indictment on double jeopardy grounds because he argued that the prosecution was secondary to his first offense.

Michael Foster's wife obtained a civil protection order against him due to domestic attacks. The order required that he not molest, assault, or in any manner threaten or physically abuse her. Later his wife sought to have him held in contempt for violation of that order. Foster also filed a motion to dismiss, arguing that his double jeopardy rights were violated because his contempt charges arose out of the original prosecution.

Opinion of the Court
The court concluded that the Double Jeopardy Clause prohibited the subsequent prosecutions of Foster for assault and Dixon for possession with intent to distribute cocaine, but did not prohibit the subsequent prosecutions of Foster for threatening to injure another or for assault with intent to kill.

See also
 List of United States Supreme Court cases, volume 509
 List of United States Supreme Court cases
 Lists of United States Supreme Court cases by volume
 List of United States Supreme Court cases by the Rehnquist Court

External links
 

United States Supreme Court cases
United States Double Jeopardy Clause case law
1993 in United States case law
United States Supreme Court cases of the Rehnquist Court